This about the German museum; for the Canadian one, see Manitoba Museum.

The Museum Mensch und Natur (English Museum of Man and Nature) is a natural history museum. It is a tenant of the Nymphenburg Palace in Munich, Germany.

Bear exhibit 
 
In 2006, the museum received the stuffed and mounted body of "Bear JJ1", nicknamed "Bruno" in the German-language press, which was a brown bear that was shot dead by a hunter as a public safety measure after several unsuccessful efforts to capture him alive. JJ1 had been part of a wildlife restoration program in Italy but walked across Austria into Germany. The bear was put on display next to the last bear previously killed (in 1835) in Bavaria.

See also 
List of museums in Germany
List of natural history museums

References

External links 
Museum Mensch und Natur website

Natural history museums in Germany
Museums in Munich